Knut Johan Bratland Kristiansen (born 14 April 1946) is a Norwegian composer and jazz musician (piano), known from Bergen jazz life primarily for his many interpretations of the music of Thelonious Monk as orchestra leader his own bands with various number of musicians involved.

Career
In his native town of Bergen, Kristiansen played with Mette Rongved (vocals), Sture Janson (bass), established several jazz orchestras (including "Bergen Big Band"), made compositions for plays at the theater Den Nationale Scene, held a variety of courses and seminars, and got the Bergen County Council Cultural Prize in 1978.

In 1983, he received the Buddy Award for contributions to world music by "The Gambian/Norwegian Friendship Orchestra" (release, 1982), the Latin jazz band "Son Mu" (1981) who released the album Son Mu (1985) and the band "Night and Day" (1986). At the same time, he was central contributor to Vossajazz, with the commissioned work to Bergen Big Band Kuria suite.

Kristiansen led the "Monk Memorial" series on the Kongsberg Jazz Festival (1987) og Nattjazz (1989), and led a Big Band on the album Monk Moods. He performed the show "A tribute to Monk" at the Oslo Jazz Festival 1997. In 2005 he released the album Blues For Ell with his own Knut Kristiansen Trio, and in 2016 the album Kuria Suite was released.

Honors 
Buddyprisen 1983 for contributions to World music
Vossajazzprisen 1990

Discography
1983: Friendship with the Gambian Norwegian Friendship Orchestra (Odin Records) commissioned work to the Bergen Jazz Forum's tenth anniversary in 1982.
1995: Monk moods (Odin Records)
2004: Blues For Ell (Dravle Records)
2016: Kuria Suite (Grappa Music), with Bergen Big Band

References

External links
Knut Kristiansen & Bergen Big Band "Kuria Suite" – Vossajazz.no (summary in English)

20th-century Norwegian pianists
21st-century Norwegian pianists
Norwegian jazz composers
Male jazz composers
Norwegian jazz pianists
Musicians from Bergen
1946 births
Living people
Norwegian male pianists
20th-century Norwegian male musicians
21st-century Norwegian male musicians